Pondy Ravi is an Indian actor who works predominantly in Tamil-language films. He has acted in over sixty films.

Career 
Pondy Ravi worked as an assistant cameraman for Minsara Kanavu (1997). He has acted as a police officer in several films including  Alaipayuthey (2000), Minnale (2001) and Kaakha Kaakha (2003). He went to an audition for Ang Lee's Life of Pi (2013). In the film, he plays a silent police officer who regulates traffic. Ravi portrayed a corrupt police officer in Vajram (2015) who acts on behalf of a minister for the sake of money. He also portrayed a lead role in a film called Saamida (2008) under the name Sembi; the film had a low-key release.

Outside acting, Ravi manages a video lab and is a liaison for films shot in Pondicherry.

Personal life 
His father is a theatre artiste in Neyveli.

Filmography

References

External links 

Living people
Indian male film actors
Male actors in Tamil cinema
Year of birth missing (living people)